{{Infobox spaceflight
| name               = NG-18 
| image              = Blog cygnus capture 110922.jpg
| image_caption      = Cygnus S.S. Sally Ride after arrival at the ISS, with solar panels damaged.
| mission_type       = ISS logistics 
| operator           = Northrop Grumman
| COSPAR_ID          = 
| SATCAT             = 
| website            = 
| mission_duration   = 3 months (planned) (in progress)
| spacecraft         = S.S Sally Ride
| spacecraft_type    = Enhanced Cygnus
| manufacturer       = 
| launch_mass        = 
| launch_date        = 7 November 2022, 10:32:42 UTC
| launch_rocket      = Antares 230+
| launch_site        = Wallops Pad 0A
| launch_contractor  = Northrop Grumman
| disposal_type      = Deorbited
| decay_date         = March 2023 (planned)
| orbit_reference    = Geocentric orbit
| orbit_regime       = Low Earth orbit
| orbit_inclination  = 51.66°
| apsis              = gee
| docking            = {{Infobox spaceflight/Dock
  | docking_target   = the International Space Station 
  | docking_type     = berth
  | docking_port     = Unity nadir
  | capture_date     = 9 November 2022, 10:20 UTC
  | docking_date     = 9 November 2022, 13:05 UTC
  | undocking_date   = March 2023 (planned)
  | release_date     = March 2023 (planned)
  | time_docked      =  (in progress)
  }}
| cargo_mass         = 
| cargo_mass_press   = 
| cargo_mass_unpress = 
| insignia           = Cygnus NG-18 Patch.png
| insignia_caption   = Cygnus NG-18 mission patch
| programme          = Commercial Resupply Services
| previous_mission   = SpaceX CRS-25
| next_mission       = SpaceX CRS-26
| programme2         = Cygnus flights
| previous_mission2  = NG-17
| next_mission2      = NG-19
}}

NG-18 is the eighteenth flight of the Northrop Grumman robotic resupply spacecraft Cygnus and its sixteenth flight to the International Space Station (ISS) under the Commercial Resupply Services (CRS-2) contract with NASA. The mission successfully launched on 7 November 2022. This is the seventh launch of Cygnus under the CRS-2 contract.

Orbital ATK (now Northrop Grumman Innovation Systems) and NASA jointly developed a new space transportation system to provide commercial cargo resupply services to the International Space Station (ISS). Under the Commercial Orbital Transportation Services (COTS) program, Orbital ATK designed, acquired, built, and assembled these components: Antares, a medium-class launch vehicle; Cygnus, an advanced spacecraft using a Pressurized Cargo Module (PCM) provided by industrial partner Thales Alenia Space and a Service Module based on the Orbital GEOStar satellite bus.

 History 
Cygnus NG-18 is the seventh Cygnus mission under the Commercial Resupply Services-2 contract.  Northrop Grumman Innovation Systems confirmed on February 23, 2021 that Thales Alenia Space of Turin, Italy, will fabricate two additional Pressurized Cargo Modules (PCMs) for a pair of forthcoming Commercial Resupply Services-2 missions. Current plans are for the two additional Cygnus spacecraft to be designated NG-18 and NG-19.

Production and integration of Cygnus spacecraft are performed in Dulles, Virginia. The Cygnus service module is mated with the pressurized cargo module at the launch site, and mission operations are conducted from control centers in Dulles, Virginia and Houston, Texas.

 Spacecraft 

This is the thirteenth flight of the Enhanced-sized Cygnus PCM.

The vehicle was named the S.S. Sally Ride'', after the first American woman in space.

Flight
NG-18 was originally scheduled to launch on November 6, 2022. However, a fire alarm resulted in an evacuation of Northrop Grumman's control center, and the flight was postponed to the next day.

The mission lifted off from the Mid-Atlantic Regional Spaceport on November 7, 2022. About six hours into the flight, NASA announced that one of the two solar arrays failed to deploy. Northrop Grumman reported that the spacecraft would still be able to reach the ISS. After assessing the situation, NASA determined a rendezvous was safe. The vehicle reached the ISS on November 9.

Manifest 

 Crew supplies:          
 Science investigations: 
 Spacewalk equipment:    
 Vehicle hardware:       
 Computer resources:

Research 
The new experiments arriving at the orbiting laboratory will inspire future scientists and explorers, and provide valuable insight for researchers. 

NASA Glenn Research Center studies: 
 Solid Fuel Ignition and Extinction – Material Ignition and Suppression Test (SoFIE-MIST)  The Solid Fuel Ignition and Extinction - Material Ignition and Suppression Test (SoFIE-MIST) investigation examines thermally-assisted burning in microgravity, by varying parameters including air flow speed, oxygen concentration, pressure, and level of external radiation.

See also 
 Uncrewed spaceflights to the International Space Station

References

External links 
 Northrop Grumman Commercial Resupply, NASA page

Cygnus (spacecraft)
Supply vehicles for the International Space Station
Spacecraft launched in 2022
Spacecraft launched by Antares rockets